Marton Priory was a priory in North Yorkshire, England. It was founded in 1154 and was occupied by Augustinian Monks and Benedictine nuns though the nuns were moved to Moxby in 1167. The priory had a water mill on the River Foss, the earthworks to this can still be seen today in the fields of the farmhouse that occupy the site. The farmhouse also has evidence in its walls of having the original stones from the priory used in its construction.

It surrendered to King Henry VIII's agents during the Dissolution of the Lesser Monasteries on 9 February 1536.

The land around Marton Abbey Farm is owned by the Church Commissioners.

References

Monasteries in North Yorkshire
1536 disestablishments in England